The Order of Saint Blaise was an order founded in Armenia in the 12th century. It took its name from Saint Blaise, patron saint of the Armenian kingdom.

The order was divided into religious, who were charged with the holy offices and missionary work among the unbelievers, and the fighters, who defended the country against the attacks of the Muslims. It rendered great services for a century and only disappeared when Armenia was conquered by the Turks.

The name has also been used by various pseudo-chivalric orders and in games such as Vampire: The Masquerade.

According to Thomas Robson (The British Herald, 1830), the order was also called the Order of St. Bass.

References

Bibliography 
 La Grande Encyclopedie s.v. Saint-Blaise (Ordre de).

Religious organizations established in the 12th century
Military orders (monastic society)